U-103 may refer to one of the following German submarines:

 , a Type U 57 submarine launched in 1917 and that served in the First World War until sunk 12 May 1918
 During the First World War, Germany also had these submarines with similar names:
 , a Type UB III submarine launched in 1917 and sunk after 14 August 1918
 , a Type UC III submarine launched in 1918 and surrendered on 22 November 1918; broken up at Cherbourg in 1921
 , a Type IXB submarine that served in the Second World War until taken out of service in March 1944; sunk on 15 April 1945

Submarines of Germany